Cairnhill Bridge Railway Station was a railway station in Scotland on the Monkland and Kirkintilloch Railway.

The station was opened by the Monkland and Kirkintilloch Railway on 10 December 1849 and closed on 1 January 1850.

References 

Disused railway stations in Scotland
Railway stations in Great Britain opened in 1849
Railway stations in Great Britain closed in 1850